House of Councillors elections were held in Japan on 4 June 1950, electing half the seats in the House. The Liberal Party won the most seats.

Results

By constituency

References

House of Councillors (Japan) elections
Japan
House of Councillors election
Japanese House of Councillors election
Election and referendum articles with incomplete results